Roberto Nielsen-Reyes (born 15 February 1943) is a Bolivian equestrian. He competed at the 1968 Summer Olympics, the 1972 Summer Olympics and the 1976 Summer Olympics.

References

External links
 

1943 births
Living people
Bolivian male equestrians
Olympic equestrians of Bolivia
Equestrians at the 1968 Summer Olympics
Equestrians at the 1972 Summer Olympics
Equestrians at the 1976 Summer Olympics
Place of birth missing (living people)